The National Football League Assistant Coach of the Year Award is presented annually by the Associated Press (AP) to the top assistant coach in the National Football League (NFL). The award is newer than any of the other AP NFL awards, having been first presented in 2014. Like its other categories, it is chosen by a panel of 50 media members. The AP award is presented at the NFL Honors.

Winners

References

National Football League trophies and awards
National Football League coaches
Coaching awards